Cast-in-place concrete or Cast-in-situ concrete is a technology of construction of buildings where walls and slabs of the buildings are cast at the site in formwork. This differs from precast concrete technology where slabs are cast elsewhere and then brought to the construction site and assembled. It uses concrete slabs for walls instead of bricks or wooden panels, and formwork is used for both walls and roof.

Advantages of this technology are strength of the building, insulation, and versatility for different types of buildings. A disadvantage is the high amount of labor required to install and remove formwork.

See also 
 Precast concrete
 Formwork

References 

Building engineering